Reginald E. Keating (14 May 1904 – 13 October 1961) was an English professional footballer who scored 42 goals in 103 appearances in the Football League.

Life and career
Keating was born in Halton, Leeds. He began his playing career in local football in the Newcastle upon Tyne area before joining Newcastle United, his first professional club, in October 1926. He was released in 1927 without playing for the first team, and embarked on a tour of league and non-league clubs: Lincoln City, where he made his debut in the Football League, Gainsborough Trinity, Scarborough, Stockport County, Birmingham, where he scored his first Football League goal, Norwich City, where he was one of five new forwards signed in the 1932 close season to add to the six already on the club's books, North Shields, and Bath City, eventually, at the age of 30, settling at Cardiff City.

In two-and-a-half seasons at Ninian Park, Keating, a pacy right-sided or centre forward, scored 35 league goals at a rate of one every other game, and was their leading goalscorer in each of his full seasons with the club. He went on to play for Doncaster Rovers, Bournemouth & Boscombe Athletic and Carlisle United, and retired in 1939.

He later acted as a scout for Preston North End, in which role he was instrumental in Howard Kendall joining the club.

Keating, the younger brother of Bristol City and Cardiff City (among others) forward Albert Keating, died in Northumberland in 1961 at the age of 57.

References

1904 births
1961 deaths
Footballers from Leeds
English footballers
Association football forwards
Annfield Plain F.C. players
Newcastle United F.C. players
Lincoln City F.C. players
Gainsborough Trinity F.C. players
Scarborough F.C. players
Stockport County F.C. players
Birmingham City F.C. players
Norwich City F.C. players
North Shields F.C. players
Bath City F.C. players
Cardiff City F.C. players
Doncaster Rovers F.C. players
AFC Bournemouth players
Carlisle United F.C. players
English Football League players